William Henry Presser (19 April 1916, Saginaw, Michigan – 20 August 2004, Lafayette, Louisiana) was a prominent American composer, violinist, and a publisher of American chamber music particularly for brass and woodwinds. Both as a composer and a publisher, he pioneered repertoire for unfamiliar instruments and combinations, such as duets for oboe with trombone, and concert recital works for instruments such as baritone saxophone and alto clarinet. He earned degrees in violin and theory from Alma College, University of Michigan, and the Eastman School of Music. His teachers included Roy Harris, Gardner Read, Bernard Rogers, Burrill Phillips, and Pierre Monteux.

Presser performed both as violinist and violist in the San Francisco Symphony and Rochester Philharmonic, and he taught at six colleges. In addition to a long association with the Interlochen summer camp, he taught composition at University of Southern Mississippi in Hattiesburg from 1953 through 1981.

Over 130 works by William Presser are in the catalogs of twenty publishers. His chamber works for winds and brass are staples of the repertoire, appearing on many contest lists and college recitals.

William Presser founded Tritone Press & Tenuto Publications in 1961 and over 41 years built a catalog of over 350 works by over 50 American composers.

References 

1916 births
2004 deaths
American classical violinists
Male classical violinists
American male violinists
American classical violists
American male composers
University of Michigan School of Music, Theatre & Dance alumni
20th-century classical violinists
20th-century American composers
20th-century American male musicians
20th-century American violinists
20th-century violists